Eugene P. Trani, Ph.D. (born November 2, 1939 in Brooklyn, New York) is a historian, educator, academic administrator, and fourth president of Virginia Commonwealth University in Richmond, Virginia, serving as president from 1990 - 2009.

Dr. Trani received a Bachelor of Arts in history from the University of Notre Dame in 1961.  He earned a Master of Arts in 1963 and Ph.D. in 1966, both from Indiana University; his doctoral advisor was the historian Robert H. Ferrell.  Dr. Trani began his academic career in the Department of History at Ohio State University, teaching there from 1965 to 1967.  From 1967 to 1976, Dr. Trani was a faculty member in the Department of History at Southern Illinois University, Carbondale, and was tenured there in 1971, becoming full Professor in 1975.  From 1976 to 1980, Dr. Trani served as Assistant Vice President for Academic Affairs at the University of Nebraska.  In 1980, Dr. Trani was appointed Vice Chancellor for Academic Affairs and Professor of History at the University of Missouri-Kansas City, and served in that position until 1986.  From 1986 to 1990, Dr. Trani was Vice President for Academic Affairs of the University of Wisconsin System, and a tenured Professor of History at the University of Wisconsin-Madison.  In 1981, Dr. Trani served as Senior Fulbright Lecturer at Moscow State University in American History.

Dr. Trani became Virginia Commonwealth University's fourth president in 1990, and served as President of VCU and the VCU Health System until 2009.  Dr. Trani had four short-term visiting research leaves during his presidency:  at the University of London in 1995, at St. John's, Cambridge in 1998, at University College Dublin in 2002, and at Lincoln College, Oxford in 2005.  The research focus of the leaves was twofold:  research on his books on American foreign policy, and also the intersection of university and community outreach around economic development.

Dr. Trani is a member of the Council on Foreign Relations, New York, and the International Institute for Strategic Studies, London.  In 1991, he was awarded an Honorary Doctor of Laws Degree from Virginia Union University, Richmond, VA;  in 2009, the Honorary Doctor of Science Degree, St. Petersburg University, Russia, 2009;  and in 2009, the Honorary Doctor of Humane Letters Degree, Virginia Commonwealth University.

President of Virginia Commonwealth University
Dr. Eugene P. Trani was appointed the fourth President of Virginia Commonwealth University on July 1, 1990, and served as President until June 30, 2009.  He also served as President and Chair of the Board of Directors of the VCU Health System (now VCU Health), and held a tenured appointment as Professor of History.   Dr. Trani continues to serve VCU as President Emeritus and University Distinguished Professor,

During Dr. Trani's presidency, VCU's enrollment grew to more than 31,000, making VCU the largest institution of higher education in the Commonwealth of Virginia.  A Carnegie Doctoral/Research University-Extensive, VCU has top-ranked academic programs on both the Monroe Park Campus and the VCU Medical Center, and is a top 100 research university.

Hallmarks of Dr. Trani's presidency include spearheading the establishment of the Virginia Biotechnology Research Park, occupying more than 1.1 million square feet, and attracting dozens of private sector companies and non-profit organizations, employing more than 2,000 scientists, researchers, engineers and technicians.  The VCU School of Engineering was created under the leadership of Dr. Trani, with Richmond having been one of the largest cities in the United States without a School of Engineering.  In 1997, VCU became the first American university to establish academic programs in Doha, Qatar, at Education City, with the VCU-Qatar College of Design Arts.

Dr. Trani brought about a major change in the operation of the VCU Medical Center, which has worked very successfully for the last 20 years, by setting up a governmental public authority to manage VCU's health operations.  In 1996, the Medical College of Virginia Hospitals Authority was established by legislation, and in 2000, the MCV Hospitals Authority became the Virginia Commonwealth University Health System Authority.  The clinical activities of MCV Hospitals, MCV Physicians and the VCU School of Medicine are now coordinated and integrated by and through VCU Health.

In his first address to the university community in 1990, among the university-wide goals Dr. Trani set forth for VCU during his presidency, two were particularly distinctive.   One was at home: an urban university, with no walls or fences, VCU reached out to all of its surrounding communities, bringing together the assets of the university, on behalf of community interests.  The other was abroad:  sixteen international partnerships—in Europe, China, Brazil, Mexico and Qatar—were established and flourished.

Dr. Trani also spearheaded a $1.2 billion investment in the institution's infrastructure.  More than $100 million was invested in construction on Broad Street—Richmond's main thoroughfare—which has attracted over $100 million of private investments to the area.  Highlights of the new capital projects built during Dr. Trani's time as president include new buildings for the Schools of Medicine, Nursing, and Dentistry, three medical research buildings, two ambulatory care facilities, and a critical care hospital on the Medical Center campus, as well as new buildings for the Schools of Engineering, Business, Arts and Life Sciences, a number of new student dormitories and apartment buildings, an on-campus athletic arena, a new student commons building and state of the art student recreational facilities on the Monroe Park campus.

After his retirement as President, along with teaching in VCU's Honors College and continuing his research and writing, Dr. Trani created an independent, nonprofit think tank, Richmond's Future.   From 2010–2016, Richmond's Future conducted fourteen research studies on topics of importance to the future of the City of Richmond and the Region.  The culminating Final Report was published in the Richmond Times-Dispatch on February 21, 2016, and a final meeting of community, business and government leaders convened on April 7, 2016.

Books

Books include:

Annotated Charles Sawyer's Concerns of a Conservative Democrat (Carbondale: Southern Illinois University Press, 1968, 399 pp., of which 51 pp. are footnotes).

The Treaty of Portsmouth:  An Adventure in American Diplomacy	(Lexington: University of Kentucky Press, 1969, 194 pp.).   Reprinted in paperback edition, University Press of Kentucky, 2014.

The Presidency of Warren G. Harding  (Lawrence:  The Regents Press of Kansas, 1977; second printing, 1985; third printing, 1989; 232 pp., a volume in the American Presidency Series), co-authored with David Wilson.

The First Cold War: The Legacy of Woodrow Wilson in U.S.-Soviet Relations, 
co-authored with Donald E. Davis (Columbia:  University of Missouri Press, 2002, 329 pp.).  Published in Russian (Moscow, Russia:  Olma-Press Publishing House, 2002, 480 pp.). Published in Chinese (Beijing, China: Peking University Press, 2007, 356 pp.).

Distorted Mirrors:  Americans and Their Relations with Russia and China in the Twentieth Century, co-authored with Donald E. Davis (Columbia:  University of Missouri Press, 2009, 461 pp.).  Published in Russian (Moscow, Russia:  Vagrius Publishers, 2009, 912 pp.).  Published in Spanish (Cordoba, Spain: University of Cordoba Press, 2009, 660 pp.).   Published in Chinese (Taipei, Taiwan, Republic of China:  Showwe Publishing, 2014, 514 pp.).

The Indispensable University:  Higher Education, Economic Development and the Knowledge Economy, co-authored with Robert Holsworth (Lanham, Maryland:  Rowman & Littlefield Publishers, 2010, paperback edition, 2013, 281 pp., published jointly with the American Council on Education).

The Reporter Who Knew Too Much:   Harrison E. Salisbury and The New York Times, co-authored with Donald E. Davis, (Lanham, Maryland:  Rowman & Littlefield Publishers, 2012, 283 pp.).

References

 "Eugene Trani's career and VCU milestones", Richmond Times-Dispatch, 2009-04-19.
 "Richmond's Future:  the Executive Summary" . Richmond Times-Dispatch, November 28, 2015.

External links

Virginia Commonwealth University administrators
Writers from Richmond, Virginia
1939 births
University of Notre Dame alumni
Living people